Tylenchus elegans is a species of marine nematodes in the family Tylenchidae and subfamily Tylenchinae. It is from the Gulf of Naples, Italy.

References 

Tylenchida
Nematodes described in 1876
Taxa named by Johannes Govertus de Man